The 2019 Kabaddi World Cup is the inaugural National (Asian) style tournament under the World Kabaddi banner. It was originally scheduled to be contested from 2 to 15 April 2019 in Melaka, Malaysia. However, the tournament was postponed and held from July 20-28 with less teams participating.

World Cup Kabaddi 2019 
World Kabaddi, formed in 2018, undertook to organise their showcase event the World Cup Kabaddi for the first time in 2019. 

Due to sponsorship and other technical issues, the tournament that had to be postponed from April to July the same year, with a reduced number of participating teams.

The tournament was hosted by the Malaysia Kabaddi Federation (MKF)

Launch 
The tournament was officially launched by the governor of the Melaka state in Malaysia HE Tun Dr Mohd Khalil Yaakob on November 17, 2018. 

Present at the launch with Mohd Khalil at the Temasek Hotel in Ujong Pasir which were World Kabaddi vice-president Jagjit Singh and state Health and Anti Drug committee chairman Low Chee Leong.

The Melaka State Malaysian Indian Youth Council (MYIC) and the Melaka State Malaysian Youth Council were the youth organisations were also supporters of the event.

Theme Song 
Composer Balanraj from Malaysia penned the theme song for the event. Music Arrangements were made by M Jegathees with Sound Engineering by Boy Ragde and the Song Lyrics and Vocals by Vinz.

Competition and Results 
Competition were held for both the men and women's categories. Powerhouses India became doubles champions, grabbing both titles at stake.

Men's results

Preliminary round

Semi-finals

Third Placing

Final

Women's Result

Preliminary Rounds 
July 22, 2019

India bt Taiwan 50-23

July 23, 2019

Malaysia bt Hong Kong 74-23

July 24, 2019

India bt Malaysia 59-23

July 25, 2019

India bt Hong Kong 61-20

Taiwan bt Malaysia 66-18

Taiwan bt Hong Kong 68-20

Semi-finals 
India bt Hong Kong 71-33

Taiwan bt Malaysia 71-22

July 27, 2029

Third Placings 
Malaysia bt Hong Kong 53-26

Final 
India bt Taiwan 47-29

Awards 
Special Awards for Players were given to outstanding players

Men 
Best Raider:Ali Sari (Iraq)

Best Defensive Player: Sachin (India)

Best Player: Amarjeet Singh (India)

Women 
Best Raider: Suman (India)

Best Defensive Player: Malarvili Balaraman (Malaysia)

Best Player: Ren Ming Qin (Taiwan)

References

External links 
 
Kabaddi World Cup
2019 in Malaysian sport
Kabaddi in Malaysia